Non-histone chromosomal protein HMG-17 is a protein that in humans is encoded by the HMGN2 gene.

See also
 High mobility group protein HMG14 and HMG17
HMGN1 (HMG-14)

References

Further reading